Prethangalude Thazhvara is a 1973 Indian Malayalam-language film, directed and produced by P. Venu. The film stars Raghavan, Bahadoor, Vijayasree, Jose Prakash and Radhamani. The film was scored by G. Devarajan.

Cast 
Raghavan
Vijayasree
Radhamani
Bahadoor
Adoor Bhasi
Thikkurissy Sukumaran Nair
Jose Prakash
Sreelatha Namboothiri

Soundtrack 
The music was composed by G. Devarajan with lyrics by Sreekumaran Thampi.

References

External links 
 

1973 films
1970s Malayalam-language films
CIDNazir3
Films directed by P. Venu